Opinion polls in Turkey (Turkish: anketler) are conducted by several companies which vary in terms of political affiliations and sampling techniques. They usually conduct polls in relation to voting intentions of the electorate during elections. Results of such polls tend to vary widely, usually due to political bias and alleged manipulation. In some cases, such as during the 2014 presidential election held on 10 August, they have been criticised for their inaccuracy. The leader of the KONDA polling company issued an apology for their inaccuracy on 15 August 2014. On a notable occasion on 17 March 2014, just before the local elections, a poll conducted by the ruling Justice and Development Party (AKP) put the opposition Republican People's Party (CHP) in the lead. This poll, like several others conducted before the local elections, did not reflect the outcome of the vote, which again put the verifiability of Turkish opinion polls in doubt.

List of polling companies

A list of major polling companies in Turkey is as follows. Alleged affiliations and history is also listed.

References